Housing, is a highly popular 2016 Chinese TV series produced by Shandong Television Media Group.The TV series, based on the events of shanty town renewal in Beiliang, Baotou, Inner Mongolia autonomous region, has brought the project back into the limelight.

Background

Beiliang, Donghe District, Baotou, is an area considered to be the cradle of the city. More than 90 percent of the buildings in Beiliang were built around 1949. Beiliang Community in Baotou is home to about 120,000 people living in slums. Many have been there for tens of years. Some share only one room between different generations, with small beds near large ones and beds near kitchen ranges. Once being the largest area of shanty housing in China.

After Chinese Vice Premier Li Keqiang visits the home of resident in Beiliang Community, a shantytown in Baotou, on Feb. 3, 2013. Beiliang started the shantytown clearance project in 2013 and has successfully completed the work. Houses covering an area of 430 million square meters were demolished and 109,000 residents were rehoused.

Story

The series is based on the events of a shanty house clearance project in Beiliang, Baotou, Inner Mongolia autonomous region. Housing tells the stories taking place during the Beiliang shanty house clearance project, which is one of the key livelihood projects of Baotou, Inner Mongolia. It depicts humanity, unity and close ties between people.

Broadcast

Music

Awards and nominations

References

External links

《安居》，央视專題

2016 Chinese television series debuts
2016 Chinese television series endings
Baotou
Television shows set in Inner Mongolia
China Central Television original programming
Chinese documentary television series
Squatting in film